The 2011 Pittsburgh Pirates season was the franchise's 125th season as a member of the National League and 130th season overall. This was their 11th season at PNC Park. The season was the first with manager Clint Hurdle, who was hired to replace the fired John Russell. After going a major league worst 57–105, they enjoyed somewhat of a resurgence, winning more than 70 games for the first time since 2004 and being covered significantly in the summer due to being involved in the pennant race, but they still locked up their 19th consecutive losing season.

Regular season

April 
The Pirates won their opening game against the Cubs in Chicago 6–3. Neil Walker led the offense with a grand slam in the fifth inning, becoming the only Pirate other than Roberto Clemente to hit a grand slam on opening day. Pittsburgh blew a lead the following day and lost, but scored two runs in the final inning of the series finale to finish their first series with a 2–1 record. Pittsburgh defeated the St. Louis Cardinals in two of three games during their second series, marking the first time the Pirates had won the majority of games in two consecutive road series since 2007. Pittsburgh came home to face the Colorado Rockies; winning one game out of four. In the second game of the series, the Pirates prevailed in a 5-hour, 10-minute game which lasted 14 innings. After an injury to starting pitcher Ross Ohlendorf, the bullpen combined for  scoreless innings—the most for the Pirates since 1900.

Tazer incident 
During the April 9 game in Pittsburgh, a local man was arrested in the left-field seating section. According to the Pittsburgh Tribune-Review, the man "appeared to be drunk, bothered fans in his section and belligerently refused to cooperate" when he would not leave at the game at the request of PNC Park employees and police. While being escorted from the section the man struck a ballpark employee, which was met with officers putting him under arrest after "Tasering him to little effect before clubbing him in the neck, head, side and legs." The entire incident was captured on video. He was charged with public drunkenness, resisting arrest, and two additional misdemeanors. In a related incident, a woman was arrested and charged with aggravated assault, disorderly conduct, and defiant trespassing. After yelling at the officers making the initial arrest, she then "resisted an officer's attempts to remove her from the park" while yelling obscenities.

May 
In May, the Pirates compiled a 13–13 (.500) record, and finished the month at 25–28 for the season.

June 
On June 24, 2011, the Pirates defeated the Boston Red Sox, 3–1, to improve their record to 38–37. This is the latest in the season that the Pirates have been above .500 since 1999.

On June 28, 2011, the Pirates defeated the Blue Jays 7–6 at the Rogers Centre, to mark their first inter-league road victory in two years.

July 
On July 8, the Pirates defeated the Chicago Cubs to enter the All-Star break above the .500 mark for the first time since 1992. The Pirates also sent three players to the All-Star Game with the selections of Kevin Correia, Joel Hanrahan and Andrew McCutchen. This marked the first time since 1990 that the team had three All-Stars in the National League lineup. While Correia did not enter the game, along with Tim Lincecum, McCutchen entered the game in the seventh inning, batting in the eighth. Hanrahan was called to close in the top of the ninth, striking out the first batter, however an untimely error from Cubs shortstop Starlin Castro and a single led to two men in scoring position. Brian Wilson got the save.

On July 15, and again on July 18, the Pirates moved into first place of the NL Central. This marked the first two times that the Pirates were in first place this late in the season since 1997.

July 25 saw the Pirates return to the national stage with their game at Atlanta being televised on ESPN.  This is the first time the Pirates had been on ESPN since September 22, 2004.  The Pirates went on to win the game 3 to 1, moving them again into a first place tie in the NL Central.

The next night, the Pirates fell victim to a controversial call in a 4–3 loss to the Braves after 19 innings. Braves infielder Julio Lugo was ruled safe at home plate by home plate umpire Jerry Meals even though replay clearly showed Lugo should have been called out.  Meals and the league both admitted the call was incorrect. The team ended up filing a complaint with the commissioner's office.

Game log

|- style="background:#cfc;"
| 1 || April 1 || @ Cubs || 6–3 || Correia (1–0) || Dempster (0–1) || Hanrahan (1) || 41,358 || 1–0
|- style="background:#fbb;"
| 2 || April 2 || @ Cubs || 3–5 || Marshall (1–0) || Meek (0–1) || Marmol (1) || 35,782 || 1–1
|- style="background:#cfc;"
| 3 || April 3 || @ Cubs || 5–4 || Karstens (1–0) || Marmol (0–1) || Hanrahan (2) || 30,857 || 2–1
|- style="background:#cfc;"
| 4 || April 4 || @ Cardinals || 4–3 || Morton (1–0) || Lohse (0–1) || Hanrahan (3) || 32,007 || 3–1
|- style="background:#fbb;"
| 5 || April 5 || @ Cardinals || 2–3 || Batista (1–0) || Olson (0–1) || Franklin (1) || 33,666 || 3–2
|- style="background:#cfc;"
| 6 || April 6 || @ Cardinals || 3–1 || Correia (2–0) || Carpenter (0–1) || Hanrahan (4) || 34,965 || 4–2
|- style="background:#fbb;"
| 7 || April 7 || Rockies || 1–7 || Rogers (1–0) || Maholm (0–1) || — || 39,219 || 4–3
|- style="background:#cfc;"
| 8 || April 8 || Rockies || 4–3 (14) || Olson (1–1) || Morales (0–1) || — || 29,192 || 5–3
|- style="background:#fbb;"
| 9 || April 9 || Rockies || 4–6 || Belisle (1–0) || Veras (0–1) || Lindstrom (1) || 25,398 || 5–4
|- style="background:#fbb;"
| 10 || April 10 || Rockies || 5–6 || Chacin (2–0) || Crotta (0–1) || Street (4) || 18,043 || 5–5
|- style="background:#bbb;"
| — || April 12 || Brewers || colspan=6 | Postponed
|- style="background:#fbb;"
| 11 || April 13 || Brewers || 0–6 || Marcum (2–1) || Correia (2–1) || — || 8,755 || 5–6
|- style="background:#fbb;"
| 12 || April 14 || Brewers || 1–4 || Wolf (1–2) || Maholm (0–2) || — || 10,517 || 5–7
|- style="background:#cfc;"
| 13 || April 15 || @ Reds || 6–1 || Morton (2–0) || Arroyo (2–1) || — || 21,312 || 6–7
|- style="background:#fbb;"
| 14 || April 16 || @ Reds || 2–11 || Leake (2–0) || McDonald (0–1) || — || 26,418 || 6–8
|- style="background:#cfc;"
| 15 || April 17 || @ Reds || 7–6 || Resop (1–0) || Ondrusek (2–1) || Hanrahan (5) || 32,105 || 7–8
|- style="background:#cfc;"
| 16 || April 18 || @ Reds || 9–3 || Correia (3–1) || Wood (1–2) || — || 12,777 || 8–8
|- style="background:#fbb;"
| 17 || April 19 || @ Marlins || 0–6 || Johnson (3–0) || Maholm (0–3) || — || 11,118 || 8–9
|- style="background:#fbb;"
| 18 || April 20 || @ Marlins || 0–6 || Nolasco (2–0) || Morton (2–1) || — || 10,112 || 8–10
|- style="background:#fbb;"
| 19 || April 21 || @ Marlins || 5–9 || Volstad (1–1) || McDonald (0–2) || — || 12,308 || 8–11
|- style="background:#bbb;"
| — || April 22 || Nationals || colspan=6 | Postponed
|- style="background:#cfc;"
| 20 || April 23 || Nationals || 7–2 || Karstens (2–0) || Hernandez (2–2) || — || 18,262 || 9–11
|- style="background:#fbb;"
| 21 || April 24 || Nationals || 3–6 || Marquis (2–0) || Correia (3–2) || Storen (3) || 9,520 || 9–12
|- style="background:#cfc;"
| 22 || April 25 || Nationals || 4–2 || Maholm (1–3) || Lannan (2–2) || Hanrahan (6) || 12,457 || 10–12
|- style="background:#fbb;"
| 23 || April 26 || Giants || 2–3 (10) || Romo (1–0) || Hanrahan (0–1) || Wilson (6) || 9,832 || 10–13
|- style="background:#cfc;"
| 24 || April 27 || Giants || 2–0 || McDonald (1–2) || Bumgarner (0–4) || Hanrahan (7) || 9,048 || 11–13
|- style="background:#fbb;"
| 25 || April 28 || Giants || 2–5 || Vogelsong (1–0) || Karstens (2–1) || Wilson (7) || 14,747 || 11–14
|- style="background:#cfc;"
| 26 || April 29 || @ Rockies || 3–0 || Correia (4–2) || Chacin (3–2) || Hanrahan (8) || 34,477 || 12–14
|- style="background:#fbb;"
| 27 || April 30 || @ Rockies || 1–4 || Hammel (3–1) || Maholm (1–4) || Street (10) || 33,684 || 12–15
|-

|- style="background:#cfc;"
| 28 || May 1 || @ Rockies || 8–4 || Morton (3–1) || Jimenez (0–2) || — || 35,012 || 13–15
|- style="background:#cfc;"
| 29 || May 2 || @ Padres || 4–3 || McDonald (2–2) || Harang (4–2) || Hanrahan (9) || 20,546 || 14–15
|- style="background:#fbb;"
| 30 || May 3 || @ Padres || 5–6 || Adams (1–0) || Beimel (0–1) || Bell (7) || 18,636 || 14–16
|- style="background:#cfc;"
| 31 || May 4 || @ Padres || 7–4 || Correia (5–2) || Richard (1–3) || — || 16,613 || 15–16
|- style="background:#fbb;"
| 32 || May 6 || Astros || 2–3 || Rodriguez (2–3) || Resop (1–1) || Melancon (1) || 12,728 || 15–17
|- style="background:#cfc;"
| 33 || May 7 || Astros || 6–1 || Morton (4–1) || Norris (2–2) || — || 32,299 || 16–17
|- style="background:#cfc;"
| 34 || May 8 || Astros || 5–4 || McCutchen (1–0) || Abad (1–3) || Hanrahan (10) || 17,946 || 17–17
|- style="background:#cfc;"
| 35 || May 9 || Dodgers || 4–1 || Veras (1–1) || Billingsley (2–2) || Hanrahan (11) || 11,373 || 18–17
|- style="background:#fbb;"
| 36 || May 10 || Dodgers || 3–10 || Lilly (3–3) || Correia (5–3) || — || 13,497 || 18–18
|- style="background:#fbb;"
| 37 || May 11 || Dodgers || 0–2 || Kuroda (4–3) || Maholm (1–5) || Padilla (3) || 12,910 || 18–19
|- style="background:#bbb;"
| — || May 12 || Dodgers || colspan=6 | Postponed
|- style="background:#fbb;"
| 38 || May 13 || @ Brewers || 2–5 || Gallardo (4–2) || McDonald (2–3) || Axford (8) || 32,837 || 18–20
|- style="background:#fbb;"
| 39 || May 14 || @ Brewers || 2–8 || Narveson (2–3) || Karstens (2–2) || — || 42,422 || 18–21
|- style="background:#fbb;"
| 40 || May 15 || @ Brewers || 6–9 || Greinke (2–1) || Correia (5–4) || — || 37,059 || 18–22
|- style="background:#fbb;"
| 41 || May 16 || @ Nationals || 2–4 || Kimball (1–0) || Maholm (1–6) || Storen (9) || 21,960 || 18–23
|- style="background:#bbb;"
| — || May 17 || @ Nationals || colspan=6 | Postponed
|- style="background:#cfc;"
| 42 || May 18 || @ Reds || 5–0 || Morton (5–1) || Arroyo (3–4) || — || 16,543 || 19–23
|- style="background:#cfc;"
| 43 || May 19 || @ Reds || 5–3 || McDonald (3–3) || Cueto (2–1) || Hanrahan (12) || 26,018 || 20–23
|- style="background:#cfc;"
| 44 || May 20 || Tigers || 10–1 || Karstens (3–2) || Penny (4–4) || — || 24,396 || 21–23
|- style="background:#cfc;"
| 45 || May 21 || Tigers || 6–2 || Correia (6–4) || Scherzer (6–1) || Hanrahan (13) || 37,958 || 22–23
|- style="background:#fbb;"
| 46 || May 22 || Tigers || 0–2 || Porcello (4–2) || Maholm (1–7) || Valverde (11) || 25,124 || 22–24
|- style="background:#fbb;"
| 47 || May 24 || Braves || 0–2 || Jurrjens (6–1) || Morton (5–2) || Kimbrel (13) || 16,873 || 22–25
|- style="background:#fbb;"
| 48 || May 25 || Braves || 2–4 (11) || Sherrill (1–0) || Karstens (3–3) || Kimbrel (14) || 21,497 || 22–26
|- style="background:#cfc;"
| 49 || May 27 || @ Cubs || 4–2 || Correia (7–4) || Davis (0–3) || Hanrahan (14) || 34,105 || 23–26
|- style="background:#cfc;"
| 50 || May 28 || @ Cubs || 10–0 || Maholm (2–7) || Wells (1–1) || — || 38,413 || 24–26
|- style="background:#fbb;"
| 51 || May 29 || @ Cubs || 2–3 || Dempster (4–4) || Karstens (3–4) || Marmol (10) || 37,464 || 24–27
|- style="background:#fbb;"
| 52 || May 30 || @ Mets || 3–7 || Gee (5–0) || McCutchen (1–1) || — || 24,490 || 24–28
|- style="background:#cfc;"
| 53 || May 31 || @ Mets || 5–1 || Meek (1–1) || Dickey (2–6) || — || 26,198 || 25–28
|-

|- style="background:#cfc;"
| 54 || June 1 || @ Mets || 9–3 || Correia (8–4) || Capuano (3–6) || — || 25,234 || 26–28
|- style="background:#fbb;"
| 55 || June 2 || @ Mets || 8–9 || Isringhausen (1–0) || Veras (1–2) || Rodriguez (16) || 30,074 || 26–29
|- style="background:#cfc;"
| 56 || June 3 || Phillies || 2–1 (12) || Moskos (1–0) || Baez (1–3) || — || 33,861 || 27–29
|- style="background:#cfc;"
| 57 || June 4 || Phillies || 6–3 || Morton (6–2) || Kendrick (3–4) || — || 39,441 || 28–29
|- style="background:#fbb;"
| 58 || June 5 || Phillies || 3–7 || Halladay (8–3) || McDonald (3–4) || — || 35,505 || 28–30
|- style="background:#cfc;"
| 59 || June 7 || D-backs || 8–5 || Resop (2–1) || Hernandez (2–2) || Hanrahan (15) || 12,378 || 29–30
|- style="background:#cfc;"
| 60 || June 8 || D-backs || 3–2 (12) || McCutchen (2–1) || Kroenke (0–1) || — || 14,015 || 30–30
|- style="background:#fbb;"
| 61 || June 9 || D-backs || 0–2 || Owings (2–0) || Resop (2–2) || Hernandez (2) || 12,468 || 30–31
|- style="background:#fbb;"
| 62 || June 10 || Mets || 1–8 || Gee (7–0) || Morton (6–3) || — || 24,653 || 30–32
|- style="background:#cfc;"
| 63 || June 11 || Mets || 3–2 || McDonald (4–4) || Dickey (3–7) || Hanrahan (16) || 39,273 || 31–32
|- style="background:#fbb;"
| 64 || June 12 || Mets || 0–7 || Capuano (5–6) || Correia (8–5) || — || 26,452 || 31–33
|- style="background:#cfc;"
| 65 || June 13 || Mets || 3–1 || Maholm (3–7) || Pelfrey (3–5) || Hanrahan (17) || 15,555 || 32–33
|- style="background:#cfc;"
| 66 || June 14 || @ Astros || 1–0 || Karstens (4–4) || Norris (4–5) || Hanrahan (18) || 29,712 || 33–33
|- style="background:#cfc;"
| 67 || June 15 || @ Astros || 7–3 || Morton (7–3) || Del Rosario (0–1) || Hanrahan (19) || 29,866 || 34–33
|- style="background:#cfc;"
| 68 || June 16 || @ Astros || 5–4 || McDonald (5–4) || Lyles (0–2) || Veras (1) || 26,415 || 35–33
|- style="background:#fbb;"
| 69 || June 17 || @ Indians || 1–5 || Tomlin (8–4) || Correia (8–6) || — || 38,549 || 35–34
|- style="background:#fbb;"
| 70 || June 18 || @ Indians || 1–5 || Carrasco (7–3) || Maholm (3–8) || — || 31,865 || 35–35
|- style="background:#fbb;"
| 71 || June 19 || @ Indians || 2–5 (11) || Sipp (3–0) || Wood (0–1) || — || 30,023 || 35–36
|- style="background:#fbb;"
| 72 || June 20 || Orioles || 3–8 || Arrieta (9–4) || Morton (7–4) || — || 22,447 || 35–37
|- style="background:#cfc;"
| 73 || June 21 || Orioles || 9–3 || Resop (3–2) || Guthrie (2–9) || — || 33,806 || 36–37
|- style="background:#cfc;"
| 74 || June 22 || Orioles || 5–4 || Correia (9–6) || Britton (6–5) || Hanrahan (20) || 19,418 || 37–37
|- style="background:#cfc;"
| 75 || June 24 || Red Sox || 3–1 || Maholm (4–8) || Lester (9–4) || Hanrahan (21) || 39,330 || 38–37
|- style="background:#cfc;"
| 76 || June 25 || Red Sox || 6–4 || Karstens (5–4) || Wakefield (4–3) || Hanrahan (22) || 39,483 || 39–37
|- style="background:#fbb;"
| 77 || June 26 || Red Sox || 2–4 || Miller (1–0) || Wood (0–2) || Papelbon (14) || 39,511 || 39–38
|- style="background:#cfc;"
| 78 || June 28 || @ Blue Jays || 7–6 || Correia (10–6) || Reyes (3–7) || Hanrahan (23) || 17,085 || 40–38
|- style="background:#fbb;"
| 79 || June 29 || @ Blue Jays || 1–2 || Morrow (4–4) || Maholm (4–9) || Francisco (9) || 15,632 || 40–39
|- style="background:#cfc;"
| 80 || June 30 || @ Blue Jays || 6–2 || Karstens (6–4) || Cecil (1–3) || — || 14,939 || 41–39
|-

|- style="background:#fbb;"
| 81 || July 1 || @ Nationals || 1–2 || Storen (5–2) || Wood (0–3) || — || 22,399 || 41–40
|- style="background:#cfc;"
| 82 || July 2 || @ Nationals || 5–3 || Veras (2–2) || Burnett (3–5) || Hanrahan (24) || — || 42–40
|- style="background:#fbb;"
| 83 || July 2 || @ Nationals || 3–4 || Mattheus (1–0) || Watson (0–1) || Storen (20) || 39,638 || 42–41
|- style="background:#cfc;"
| 84 || July 3 || @ Nationals || 10–2 || Correia (11–6) || Marquis (7–3) || — || 23,522 || 43–41
|- style="background:#cfc;"
| 85 || July 4 || Astros || 5–3 || Maholm (5–9) || Myers (3–8) || Hanrahan (25) || 36,942 || 44–41
|- style="background:#cfc;"
| 86 || July 5 || Astros || 5–1 || Karstens (7–4) || Rodriguez (6–5) || — || 18,151 || 45–41
|- style="background:#fbb;"
| 87 || July 6 || Astros || 2–8 || Norris (5–6) || Morton (7–5) || — || 18,910 || 45–42
|- style="background:#cfc;"
| 88 || July 8 || Cubs || 7–4 || McCutchen (3–1) || Marshall (5–3) || Hanrahan (26) || 37,140 || 46–42
|- style="background:#fbb;"
| 89 || July 9 || Cubs || 3–6 || Dempster (6–6) || Correia (11–7) || Marmol (19) || 39,235 || 46–43
|- style="background:#cfc;"
| 90 || July 10 || Cubs || 9–1 || Maholm (6–9) || Ortiz (0–2) || — || 31,428 || 47–43
|- style="background:#cfc;"
| 91 || July 15 || @ Astros || 4–0 || Karstens (8–4) || Myers (3–10) || — || 27,787 || 48–43
|- style="background:#fbb;"
| 92 || July 16 || @ Astros || 4–6 || Escalona (2–1) || Veras (2–3) || Melancon (7) || 35,081 || 48–44
|- style="background:#cfc;"
| 93 || July 17 || @ Astros || 7–5 (11) || Leroux (1–0) || Melancon (5–3) || Resop (1) || 24,580 || 49–44
|- style="background:#cfc;"
| 94 || July 18 || Reds || 2–0 || Morton (8–5) || Willis (0–1) || Hanrahan (27) || 22,016 || 50–44
|- style="background:#cfc;"
| 95 || July 19 || Reds || 1–0 || McDonald (6–4) || Leake (8–5) || Hanrahan (28) || 26,058 || 51–44
|- style="background:#fbb;"
| 96 || July 20 || Reds || 1–3 || Cueto (6–3) || Karstens (8–5) || Cordero (19) || 25,207 || 51–45
|- style="background:#fbb;"
| 97 || July 22 || Cardinals || 4–6 || Carpenter (6–7) || Maholm (6–10) || Salas (18) || 38,490 || 51–46
|- style="background:#fbb;"
| 98 || July 23 || Cardinals || 1–9 || Garcia (10–4) || Correia (11–8) || — || 39,102 || 51–47
|- style="background:#cfc;"
| 99 || July 24 || Cardinals || 4–3 (10) || Beimel (1–1) || Motte (3–2) || — || 35,402 || 52–47
|- style="background:#cfc;"
| 100 || July 25 || @ Braves || 3–1 || McDonald (7–4) || Hudson (9–7) || Hanrahan (29) || 30,098 || 53–47
|- style="background:#fbb;"
| 101 || July 26 || @ Braves || 3–4 (19) || Proctor (2–3) || McCutchen (3–2) || — || 22,036 || 53–48
|- style="background:#fbb;"
| 102 || July 27 || @ Braves || 1–2 (10) || Linebrink (4–2) || Leroux (1–1) || — || 24,186 || 53–49
|- style="background:#cfc;"
| 103 || July 28 || @ Braves || 5–2 || Correia (12–8) || Lowe (6–9) || Hanrahan (30) || 38,355 || 54–49
|- style="background:#fbb;"
| 104 || July 29 || @ Phillies || 3–10 || Halladay (13–4) || Morton (8–6) || — || 45,599 || 54–50
|- style="background:#fbb;"
| 105 || July 30 || @ Phillies || 4–7 || Lee (10–7) || McDonald (7–5) || Madson (18) || 45,737 || 54–51
|- style="background:#fbb;"
| 106 || July 31 || @ Phillies || 5–6 (10) || Bastardo (4–0) || Watson (0–2) || — || 45,809 || 54–52
|-

|- style="background:#fbb;"
| 107 || August 1 || Cubs || 3–5 || Zambrano (8–6) || Maholm (6–11) || Marmol (21) || 22,248 || 54–53
|- style="background:#fbb;"
| 108 || August 2 || Cubs || 6–11 || Wells (3–4) || Correia (12–9) || — || 26,109 || 54–54
|- style="background:#fbb;"
| 109 || August 3 || Cubs || 0–1 || Garza (5–8) || Resop (3–3) || Marmol (22) || 19,106 || 54–55
|- style="background:#fbb;"
| 110 || August 4 || Cubs || 6–7 || Samardzija (6–4) || McCutchen (3–3) || Marmol (23) || 29,317 || 54–56
|- style="background:#fbb;"
| 111 || August 5 || Padres || 5–15 || Harang (10–3) || Karstens (8–6) || — || 37,766 || 54–57
|- style="background:#fbb;"
| 112 || August 6 || Padres || 2–13 || Luebke (4–6) || Maholm (6–12) || — || 39,251 || 54–58
|- style="background:#fbb;"
| 113 || August 7 || Padres || 3–7 || Latos (6–11) || Correia (12–10) || — || 35,601 || 54–59
|- style="background:#cfc;"
| 114 || August 8 || @ Giants || 5–0 || Morton (9–6) || Vogelsong (9–2) || — || 42,405 || 55–59
|- style="background:#fbb;"
| 115 || August 9 || @ Giants || 0–6 || Bumgarner (7–11) || McDonald (7–6) || — || 42,648 || 55–60
|- style="background:#cfc;"
| 116 || August 10 || @ Giants || 9–2 || Karstens (9–6) || Sanchez (4–7) || — || 42,603 || 56–60
|- style="background:#fbb;"
| 117 || August 12 || @ Brewers || 2–7 || Greinke (11–4) || Maholm (6–13) || — || 41,820 || 56–61
|- style="background:#fbb;"
| 118 || August 13 || @ Brewers || 0–1 || Estrada (3–7) || Correia (12–11) || Axford (34) || 43,214 || 56–62
|- style="background:#fbb;"
| 119 || August 14 || @ Brewers || 1–2 (10) || Saito (3–1) || Resop (3–4) || — || 45,103 || 56–63
|- style="background:#cfc;"
| 120 || August 15 || Cardinals || 6–2 || McDonald (8–6) || Westbrook (9–7) || — || 19,766 || 57–63
|- style="background:#cfc;"
| 121 || August 16 || Cardinals || 5–4 (11) || Resop (4–4) || Rhodes (0–1) || — || 20,943 || 58–63
|- style="background:#fbb;"
| 122 || August 17 || Cardinals || 2–7 || Lohse (11–7) || Maholm (6–14) || — || 22,296 || 58–64
|- style="background:#fbb;"
| 123 || August 19 || Reds || 8–11 || Wood (6–5) || Hanrahan (0–2) || Cordero (25) || 36,620 || 58–65
|- style="background:#cfc;"
| 124 || August 20 || Reds || 5–3 || Watson (1–2) || Chapman (2–1) || Hanrahan (31) || 37,826 || 59–65
|- style="background:#fbb;"
| 125 || August 21 || Reds || 4–5 || Arredondo (3–3) || Hanrahan (0–3) || Cordero (26) || 29,967 || 59–66
|- style="background:#fbb;"
| 126 || August 22 || Brewers || 1–8 || Narveson (9–6) || Karstens (9–7) || — || — || 59–67
|- style="background:#cfc;"
| 127 || August 22 || Brewers || 9–2 || McCutchen (4–3) || Greinke (12–5) || — || 19,380 || 60–67
|- style="background:#fbb;"
| 128 || August 23 || Brewers || 4–11 || Estrada (4–8) || Ohlendorf (0–1) || — || 21,411 || 60–68
|- style="background:#cfc;"
| 129 || August 24 || Brewers || 2–0 || Grilli (1–0) || Marcum (11–4) || Hanrahan (32) || 18,013 || 61–68
|- style="background:#fbb;"
| 130 || August 25 || @ Cardinals || 4–8 || Jackson (3–2) || Morton (9–7) || — || 36,503 || 61–69
|- style="background:#fbb;"
| 131 || August 26 || @ Cardinals || 4–5 || McClellan (10–6) || Veras (2–4) || — || 40,480 || 61–70
|- style="background:#cfc;"
| 132 || August 27 || @ Cardinals || 7–0 || Lincoln (1–0) || Carpenter (8–9) || — || 35,812 || 62–70
|- style="background:#fbb;"
| 133 || August 28 || @ Cardinals || 4–7 || Lohse (12–8) || Karstens (9–8) || Motte (1) || 38,429 || 62–71
|- style="background:#fbb;"
| 134 || August 29 || @ Astros || 4–7 || Rodriguez (10–9) || Grilli (1–1) || Melancon (15) || 19,250 || 62–72
|- style="background:#fbb;"
| 135 || August 30 || @ Astros || 2–8 || Sosa (2–2) || Morton (9–8) || — || 21,750 || 62–73
|- style="background:#fbb;"
| 136 || August 31 || @ Astros || 0–2 || Happ (5–15) || McDonald (8–7) || Melancon (16) || 22,918 || 62–74
|-

|- style="background:#fbb;"
| 137 || September 1 || Dodgers || 4–6 || Eveland (1–0) || Lincoln (1–1) || Jansen (3) || 12,224 || 62–75
|- style="background:#cfc;"
| 138 || September 2 || @ Cubs || 3–1 || Burres (1–0) || Dempster (10–11) || Hanrahan (33) || 35,153 || 63–75
|- style="background:#cfc;"
| 139 || September 3 || @ Cubs || 7–5 || Resop (5–4) || Marmol (2–5) || Hanrahan (34) || 36,628 || 64–75
|- style="background:#fbb;"
| 140 || September 4 || @ Cubs || 3–6 || Wells (7–4) || Morton (9–9) || Marshall (4) || 40,469 || 64–76
|- style="background:#cfc;"
| 141 || September 5 || Astros || 3–1 || McDonald (9–7) || Sosa (2–3) || Hanrahan (35) || 13,366 || 65–76
|- style="background:#fbb;"
| 142 || September 6 || Astros || 1–4 || Myers (4–13) || Lincoln (1–2) || Melancon (17) || 9,840 || 65–77
|- style="background:#cfc;"
| 143 || September 7 || Astros || 5–4 || Watson (2–2) || Lopez (2–6) || Hanrahan (36) || 12,330 || 66–77
|- style="background:#fbb;"
| 144 || September 9 || Marlins || 4–13 || Nolasco (10–10) || Ohlendorf (0–2) || — || 24,527 || 66–78
|- style="background:#fbb;"
| 145 || September 10 || Marlins || 0–3 || Sanchez (8–7) || Locke (0–1) || — || 34,063 || 66–79
|- style="background:#fbb;"
| 146 || September 11 || Marlins || 1–4 || Vazquez (10–11) || McDonald (9–8) || Oviedo (34) || 19,071 || 66–80
|- style="background:#cfc;"
| 147 || September 12 || Cardinals || 6–5 || Grilli (2–1) || Rzepczynski (0–2) || Hanrahan (37) || 13,278 || 67–80
|- style="background:#fbb;"
| 148 || September 13 || Cardinals || 4–6 || McClellan (11–6) || Hanrahan (0–4) || Motte (6) || 16,544 || 67–81
|- style="background:#fbb;"
| 149 || September 14 || Cardinals || 2–3 || Jackson (5–2) || Morton (9–10) || Motte (7) || 12,520 || 67–82
|- style="background:#cfc;"
| 150 || September 15 || @ Dodgers || 6–2 || Ohlendorf (1–2) || Eveland (2–1) || Hanrahan (38) || 25,381 || 68–82
|- style="background:#fbb;"
| 151 || September 16 || @ Dodgers || 2–7 || Kuroda (12–16) || Locke (0–2) || — || 41,148 || 68–83
|- style="background:#fbb;"
| 152 || September 17 || @ Dodgers || 1–6 || Lilly (10–14) || McDonald (9–9) || — || 32,514 || 68–84
|- style="background:#fbb;"
| 153 || September 18 || @ Dodgers || 1–15 || Billingsley (11–10) || Lincoln (1–3) || — || 37,802 || 68–85
|- style="background:#fbb;"
| 154 || September 19 || @ D-backs || 0–1 || Kennedy (20–4) || Karstens (9–9) || Putz (42) || 24,458 || 68–86
|- style="background:#cfc;"
| 155 || September 20 || @ D-backs || 5–3 || Morton (10–10) || Hudson (16–11) || Hanrahan (39) || 30,114 || 69–86
|- style="background:#fbb;"
| 156 || September 21 || @ D-backs || 5–8 || Miley (4–2) || Ohlendorf (1–3) || Putz (43) || 25,296 || 69–87
|- style="background:#cfc;"
| 157 || September 23 || Reds || 4–3 || Hanrahan (1–4) || Bray (5–3) || — || 23,632 || 70–87
|- style="background:#cfc;"
| 158 || September 24 || Reds || 4–3 || Lincoln (2–3) || Wood (6–6) || Grilli (1) || 37,388 || 71–87
|- style="background:#fbb;"
| 159 || September 25 || Reds || 4–5 || Willis (1–6) || Moskos (1–1) || Cordero (35) || 28,758 || 71–88
|- style="background:#cfc;"
| 160 || September 26 || @ Brewers || 9–8 || McCutchen (5–3) || Saito (4–2) || Hanrahan (40) || 41,222 || 72–88
|- style="background:#fbb;"
| 161 || September 27 || @ Brewers || 4–6 || Hawkins (3–1) || Hughes (0–1) || Axford (46) || 41,864 || 72–89
|- style="background:#fbb;"
| 162 || September 28 || @ Brewers || 3–7 || Greinke (16–6) || Locke (0–3) || — || 41,976 || 72–90
|-

|-
| Legend:       = Win       = Loss       = PostponementBold = Pirates team member

Divisional standings

Record vs. opponents

Detailed records

Roster

Opening Day lineup

Notable achievements

Awards
2011 Major League Baseball All-Star Game
Joel Hanrahan, P, reserve
Andrew McCutchen, OF, reserve
Kevin Correia, P, reserve

NL Player of the Week
Jeff Karstens (July 11–17, 2011)

MLB Delivery Man of the Month Award
Joel Hanrahan (June 2011)

Milestones

Transactions

Pre-season
On November 3, 2010, the Pittsburgh Pirates re-signed Wil Ledezma to a 1-year contract.
On November 12, 2010, the Pittsburgh Pirates lost free agent Erik Kratz to the Philadelphia Phillies.
On November 15, 2010, the Pittsburgh Pirates hired Clint Hurdle as manager.
On November 19, 2010, the Pittsburgh Pirates lost free agent Hector Gimenez to the Los Angeles Dodgers.
On November 22, 2010, the Pittsburgh Pirates lost free agent Dana Eveland to the Los Angeles Dodgers.
On November 24, 2010, the Pittsburgh Pirates hired Euclides Rojas as bullpen coach, Gregg Ritchie as hitting coach, Luis Silverio as first-base coach, Nick Leyva as third-base coach and Mark Strittmatter.
On November 24, 2010, the Pittsburgh Pirates traded Zach Duke to the Arizona Diamondbacks for a player to be named later (Cesar Valdez).
On December 3, 2010, the Pittsburgh Pirates re-signed Jeff Karstens to a 1-year contract and Ronny Cedeño to a 1-year contract with an option for 2012.
On December 7, 2010, the Pittsburgh Pirates signed free agents Kevin Correia to a 2-year contract  and Scott Olsen to a 1-year contract with an option for 2012.
On December 8, 2010, the Pittsburgh Pirates signed free agent Matt Diaz to a 2-year contract.
On December 14, 2010, the Pittsburgh Pirates signed free agent Lyle Overbay to a 1-year contract.
On December 23, 2010, the Pittsburgh Pirates traded Ryan Kelly to the Oakland Athletics in exchange for Corey Wimberly.
On December 23, 2010, the Pittsburgh Pirates claimed free agent Aaron Thompson off waivers from the Washington Nationals.
On January 4, 2011, the Pittsburgh Pirates traded Joe Martinez to the Cleveland Indians in exchange for a player to be named later or cash considerations.
On January 5, 2011, the Pittsburgh Pirates lost free agent Wil Ledezma to the Toronto Blue Jays.
On January 18, 2011, the Pittsburgh Pirates re-signed Joel Hanrahan to a 1-year contract.
On February 9, 2011, the Pittsburgh Pirates re-signed Ross Ohlendorf to a 1-year/$2.025 million contract.

In-Season
On March 3, 2011, the Pittsburgh Pirates re-signed Alex Presley, Andrew McCutchen, Bryan Morris, Brad Lincoln, Charlie Morton, Chris Leroux, Chris Resop, Daniel McCutchen, Daniel Moskos, Evan Meek, Garrett Jones, Gorkys Hernández, James McDonald, Jason Jaramillo, Jeff Locke, John Bowker, José Ascanio, José Tábata, Josh Rodriguez, Kevin Hart, Kyle McPherson, Mike Crotta, Neil Walker, Pedro Ciriaco, Ramon Aguero, Steve Pearce and Tony Watson to 1-year contracts.
On March 21, 2011, the Pittsburgh Pirates released Garrett Atkins.
On March 22, 2011, the Pittsburgh Pirates released Fernando Nieve.
On April 6, 2011, the Pittsburgh Pirates released Craig Hansen.
On April 8, 2011, the Pittsburgh Pirates lost free agent Ramon Aguero to the Texas Rangers.
On April 22, 2011, the Pittsburgh Pirates claimed free agent Brandon Wood from the Los Angeles Angels.
On April 26, 2011, the Pittsburgh Pirates claimed free agent Xavier Paul from the Los Angeles Dodgers.
On May 14, 2011, the Pittsburgh Pirates released Scott Olsen.
On June 13, 2011, the Pittsburgh Pirates traded a player to be named later or cash considerations to the Boston Red Sox in exchange for Michael McKenry.
On June 21, 2011, the Pittsburgh Pirates traded cash considerations to the Cleveland Indians in exchange for Josh Rodriguez.
On July 21, 2011, the Pittsburgh Pirates signed free agent Jason Grilli to a 1-year contract.
On July 31, 2011, the Pittsburgh Pirates traded Aaron Baker to the Baltimore Orioles in exchange for Derrek Lee.
On July 31, 2011, the Pittsburgh Pirates traded a player to be named later or cash considerations to the San Diego Padres in exchange for Ryan Ludwick.
On August 18, 2011, the Pittsburgh Pirates traded a player to be named later or cash considerations to the Texas Rangers in exchange for Tim Wood.
On August 21, 2011, the Pittsburgh Pirates re-signed José Tábata to a 6-year contract extension through 2016 with options for 2017–19.
On August 31, 2011, the Pittsburgh Pirates traded Matt Diaz and cash considerations to the Atlanta Braves in exchange for a player to be named later (Eliecer Cardenas; converted on September 20, 2011).
On August 31, 2011, the Pittsburgh Pirates traded John Bowker to the Philadelphia Phillies in exchange for future considerations.
On September 11, 2011, the Pittsburgh Pirates re-signed Neal Huntington as senior VP and GM to a 3-year contract extension through 2014.
On September 14, 2011, the Pittsburgh Pirates claimed Matt Pagnozzi off waivers from the Colorado Rockies.
On September 16, 2011, the Pittsburgh Pirates promoted Greg Smith to assistant GM, Joe Dellicarri to director of amateur scouting, Kevan Graves to director of baseball operations, Kyle Stark to assistant GM, Larry Broadway to director of minor league operations and Tyrone Brooks to director of player personnel.
On October 24, 2011, the Pittsburgh Pirates hired Ben Potenziano as assistant trainer and Brendon Huttman as strength and conditioning coach.

Farm system

References

External links
2011 Pittsburgh Pirates season Official Site
2011 Pittsburgh Pirates season at Baseball Reference

Pittsburgh Pirates seasons
Pittsburgh Pirates season
Pitts